Jonathan Haze (born Jack Schachter; April 1, 1929) is an American actor, producer and screenwriter. He is best known for his work in Roger Corman films, especially the 1960 black comedy cult classic, The Little Shop of Horrors, in which he played florist's assistant Seymour Krelborn.

Early years
Haze is the son of Mr. and Mrs. Harry Schachter of the Squirrel Hill neighborhood in Pittsburgh, Pennsylvania.

Early career
Haze was working at a gas station in California when he was discovered by Wyott Ordung. Ordung was directing the movie Monster from the Ocean Floor (1954), which was being produced by Corman, and offered a small part to Haze. 

Corman, three years Haze's senior, was impressed and cast Haze in many of his films over the next ten years, including Apache Woman (1955), Day the World Ended (1955), Gunslinger (1956), The Oklahoma Woman (1956), It Conquered the World (1956), Swamp Women (1956), Naked Paradise (1957), Not of This Earth (1957), Rock All Night (1957), The Viking Women and the Sea Serpent (1957), Carnival Rock (1957), The Little Shop of Horrors (1960), and The Terror (1963). 

Haze also appeared in non-Corman films, such as Bayou (1957), Stakeout on Dope Street (1958), Ghost of the China Sea (1958) and Forbidden Island (1959).

Later work

In 1959, Haze guest starred in the episode "Terror Town" of NBC's western television series Cimarron City, starring George Montgomery. Dan Duryea who portrayed the mastermind of a criminal enterprise in silver who is the half-brother of Haze's character. 
 
Haze later branched into other aspects of film making. He wrote the 1962 science fiction/comedy film Invasion of the Star Creatures. He also worked in production for such films as Premature Burial (1962), The Terror (1963), Medium Cool (1969), Another Nice Mess (1972), and Corman's own The Born Losers (1967).

Writing
In 1957, Haze sold his first screenplay to Arrarat Productions. The Monster of Nicholson Mesa was a parody of horror films.

References

Further reading
 

Scary Monsters Magazine, June, 2010 no.75. "An Interview With Jonathan Haze", massive 29 page interview with Jonathan Haze by writers/interviewers, Paul Parla and Lawrence Fultz Jr.
Scary Monsters Magazine, January, 2007 no. 61. "Not Of This Earth Interview Jonathan Haze" by writers/interviewers, Lawrence Fultz Jr. and Dennis Druktenis.
Psychotronic Magazine, 1998. Vol.1, no.27 "Jonathan Haze" article/interview by Justin Humphreys.
Filmfax, Vol.1 no.5. "Jonathan Haze" article/interview by Sharon Williams.

External links
 

American male film actors
1929 births
Living people